Private Hugh Montgomery was a soldier of the 29th Regiment of Foot who was present at the Boston Massacre. He killed one man and was found guilty of manslaughter.

The Boston Massacre
On 5 March 1770, seven British soldiers, including Montgomery, were dispatched to King Street in Boston, Massachusetts, to relieve Private Hugh White. Montgomery was the first British soldier to fire in what subsequently became known as the Boston Massacre.

On 27 March, Montgomery was indicted for murder. He was held in prison pending trial, which took place in November–December 1770, in Boston. John Adams, who would later become President of the United States, was his attorney.

Montgomery and fellow soldier Matthew Kilroy were both found guilty of manslaughter on 5 December. They returned to court nine days later and "prayed clergy" to avoid the death sentence. Instead, they were branded on the thumb, with a hot iron, the letter "M" for murder. The two reportedly burst into tears before receiving the punishment.

Montgomery had a wife and four children staying with him in Boston.

References

Worcestershire Regiment soldiers
British people convicted of manslaughter
People acquitted of murder
Year of birth uncertain
1770 deaths
Boston Massacre
British mass murderers